The Akaroa by-election 1858 was a by-election held in the  electorate during the 2nd New Zealand Parliament, on 31 May 1858. The by-election was caused by the resignation of incumbent MP John Cuff on 12 January 1878.

The election and was won unopposed by William Moorhouse, who had represented the seat in the previous parliament.

References

Akaroa 1858
1858 elections in New Zealand
Akaroa
May 1858 events